The Washington County Jail is a historic former civic building at 90 South College Avenue in Fayetteville, Arkansas.  Built in 1896, this building was the fourth to serve as county jail, and was in use until 1973, making it the longest tenured in county history.  The Romanesque Revival building was designed by W. B. Reese, and is locally unusual and distinctive for its medieval appearance.  It is built out of load-bearing stone, square cut and laid in irregular courses, with a rough quarry-cut finish.  Most of the building is of darker shades with trim in lighter shades.  Nominally two stories in height, the rightmost bay has a square tower with crenellated parapet.

The building, which is now in private hands, was listed on the National Register of Historic Places in 1978.

See also
National Register of Historic Places listings in Washington County, Arkansas

References

Romanesque Revival architecture in Arkansas
Government buildings completed in 1896
Jails on the National Register of Historic Places in Arkansas
National Register of Historic Places in Fayetteville, Arkansas
1896 establishments in Arkansas